Lake Tallavana is a former logging community located two miles (3 km) west of Havana on Highway 12 in Gadsden County, Florida, United States.

A 40-acre (16 ha) lake, Pine Top Lake, was enlarged to 160 acres (65 ha) and renamed Lake Tallavana.

References

External links
Lake Tallavana (Florida Hometown Locator)

Unincorporated communities in Gadsden County, Florida
Tallahassee metropolitan area
Unincorporated communities in Florida